The 3rd Kansas Infantry Regiment was an infantry regiment from Kansas that failed to complete its organization to serve in the Union Army during the American Civil War. It was consolidated with the 4th Regiment Kansas Volunteer Infantry to form the 10th Regiment Kansas Volunteer Infantry.

See also

 List of Kansas Civil War Units

References

Bibliography 
 Dyer, Frederick H. (1959). A Compendium of the War of the Rebellion. New York and London. Thomas Yoseloff, Publisher. .

Units and formations of the Union Army from Kansas
1864 establishments in Kansas
Military units and formations established in 1864
Military units and formations disestablished in 1864